These are the results of the men's 54 kg competition in weightlifting at the 1996 Summer Olympics in Atlanta.  A total number of 21 athletes competed in this event.

Results
Each weightlifter had three attempts for both the snatch and clean and jerk lifting methods.  The total of the best successful lift of each method was used to determine the final rankings and medal winners.

References

External links
Official Olympic Report 

054